David Roland Clément Grondin (born 8 May 1980) is a French former footballer. Grondin, who played as a left back,  featured for Arsenal as well as several French and Belgian clubs.

Career
Grondin, featuring as a winger, played in 1994 for Saint-Étienne in his youth career. He then left Les Verts to join Arsenal in 1998 for £500,000. While at the Gunners, Grondin was loaned back out to Saint Etienne in 1999. He also had loan spells at AS Cannes in 2000 as well as K.S.K. Beveren of the Belgian First Division A a season later. Grondin only made four appearances for Arsenal in all competitions. He played one Premiership match for Arsenal, starting in a 0-0 draw against Liverpool in January 1999.

After leaving Arsenal, Grondin joined Scottish side Dunfermline Athletic, initially on loan before signing permanently in 2003. At Dunfermline, Grondin scored once, against Rangers in the Scottish Cup.  While at Dunfermline he also played in the 2004 Scottish Cup Final, where he received a runners-up medal. In 2004 he moved to Ligue 2 club Stade Brestois. On 6 August 2009, Mons signed the French left-back from KV Mechelen. Grondin then stayed at Mons for the following season. He then made the switch to F.C. Brussels, where he ended his footballing career.

References

External links

1980 births
Living people
People from Juvisy-sur-Orge
Footballers from Essonne
Footballers from Réunion
French footballers
Association football midfielders
Arsenal F.C. players
Dunfermline Athletic F.C. players
AS Saint-Étienne players
AS Cannes players
K.S.K. Beveren players
Stade Brestois 29 players
Royal Excel Mouscron players
K.V. Mechelen players
R.A.E.C. Mons players
Premier League players
Scottish Premier League players
Belgian Pro League players
French expatriate footballers
Expatriate footballers in Belgium
Expatriate footballers in England
Expatriate footballers in Scotland
French expatriate sportspeople in Belgium
French expatriate sportspeople in England
French expatriate sportspeople in Scotland
Mediterranean Games bronze medalists for France
Mediterranean Games medalists in football
Competitors at the 2001 Mediterranean Games